Paddy Boom (born Patrick Seacor on September 6, 1968) is an American professional drummer. He was the original drummer in the American glam rock band Scissor Sisters.

Biography

Early life
Born in Singapore, as a teenager he taught himself to play drums, copying the style of U2's Larry Mullen Jr., using curtain rods fashioned into drumsticks on his sofa. He then progressed on to other drummers, and became a big fan of Stewart Copeland from The Police.

Patrick attended the School of Visual Arts in Manhattan to study advertising, where he met Bryan Hynes and Robert Brochu. The three formed the Sloane Rangers a seminal indie art-rock band that was a fixture in the New York rock scene for nearly a decade. TSR recorded two album 1990s "From The From" and 1992's "Scram", the later produced by Mark Spencer, guitarist for Lisa Loeb, Freedy Johnston and Blood Oranges. The Sloane Rangers (TSR) recorded their two albums for Invert Records, an independent label that was founded by Stephen Struthers and Robert Sherman.   Invert Records promoted a number of talented bands out of N.Y.C. including Several Other Men, and The Pleasantries.

After TSR, he drummed for many different bands in New York, and started a record label, Boom Boom Records. Through Boom Boom he published his band Faith, for whom he drummed and sang backing vocals.

Scissor Sisters
Paddy drummed professionally in New York for 15 years before he began to feel that his "shelf life was dangerously close to the end". He was looking for a new project, and found Scissor Sisters.

He was, and remains, a huge U2 fan, and his dream came true when Scissor Sisters were asked by Bono to open for them on U2's 2005 Vertigo tour. From the words of Paddy, when quoting the Beastie Boys, "I would have given up long ago if it weren't for the music."

After an absence from the band's live lineup for 18 months, it was announced on 16 October 2008 that Paddy had amicably parted ways with the Scissor Sisters.

References 
Interview with Paddy Boom at Lowlands Festival 2005

External links
Official Site
ScissorSistersAndFriends

 Underground Illusion - The Ultimate Scissor Sisters Database

1968 births
Living people
Scissor Sisters members
Singaporean emigrants to the United States
American rock drummers
20th-century American drummers
American male drummers